The Ellipse Fuji is a French high-wing, single-place, hang glider that was designed and produced by La société Ellipse of Étuz.

Design and development
The Fuji was designed as an intermediate hang glider for local recreational and cross-country flying. Built in four sizes, it is also suitable for adding a motorized harness for powered hang glider operations.

Typical of the series, the Fuji 15 is made from aluminum tubing, with the wing covered in Dacron sailcloth. Its  span wing is cable braced from a single kingpost. The nose angle is 122° and the aspect ratio is 6.6:1. The model number indicates the approximate wing area in square metres.

Operational history
The Fuji 15 is used on the DTA Alizés nanotrike and the Electravia Electro Trike.

Variants
Fuji 13
Fuji 14
Fuji 15
Fuji 16
Fuji 16 Moteur

Specifications (Fuji 16)

References

Hang gliders